"Universe" is a song by the British rock band Slade, released in 1991 as the second single from the band's compilation album Wall of Hits. It was written and produced by bassist Jim Lea. The song failed to chart in the UK and was the band's last single before disbanding in 1992.

In 2007, Lea would release his own solo version of "Universe" on his debut solo album Therapy.

Background
After their contract with RCA expired in 1987, Slade decided to take an eighteen-month break. Although the band announced their intentions to record a new album, these plans did not materialise. Later in 1991, the band's former label Polydor approached them with the idea of recording two new singles to promote a new compilation album Wall of Hits. The two singles, "Radio Wall of Sound" and "Universe", were soon completed, with "Radio Wall of Sound" being released in October 1991. The band's first Top 40 hit since 1984, it reached No. 21 in the UK. With the release of Wall of Hits in November, "Universe" followed in December and attempted to attract the Christmas market. However, it failed to chart in the UK. With the commercial failure of "Universe", Polydor's option for a new studio album was withdrawn and the band would split up in 1992.

Like "Radio Wall of Sound", "Universe" was originally a solo recording of Lea's, who had completed much of the song's recording prior to it becoming a Slade song. Lea planned to add strings to the song at Abbey Road, however as the studio was booked, he used a synthesiser to record the strings section at Rich Bitch Studios instead.

In a 1992 fan club interview, Holder spoke of the song in relation to "Radio Wall of Sound", and about its commercial failure: 

In his 1999 biography Who's Crazee Now?, Holder said: ""Universe" was very orchestral, backed by strings and totally unlike anything we had ever done before as Slade. It bombed [and] was too far from what people expected of us." In a 2000 interview with Mojo, Lea recalled: "The last thing that came out was "Universe" - very big and lush. Towards the end the records were completely my songs. I'd taken control and it didn't feel like a band any more. All the fun had gone out of it, so I started getting into the property business, and took a psychology course at college."

Release
"Universe" was released by Polydor Records on 7" vinyl and CD in the UK and across Europe. In the UK, the single was also released on 12" vinyl and cassette. The first B-side, "Red Hot", was exclusive to the single and would later appear on the band's 2007 compilation B-Sides. It was written by guitarist Dave Hill and ex-Wizzard keyboardist Bill Hunt. The second B-side was the band's 1973 hit "Merry Xmas Everybody". On the 12" and CD formats of the single, the band's 1977 single "Gypsy Roadhog" was also included as a third B-side.

Promotion
A music video was filmed to promote the single, which was directed by William Clark and filmed at a studio in Shepherd's Bush. Rated as one of Slade's most evocative videos, Powell noted in his diary at the time that "we go Amadeus on the video", in reference to the 1984 American period drama film of the same name.

In the UK, the band performed the song on This Morning, Motormouth and Pebble Mill. In the Netherlands, they performed the song for Countdown, however it was never broadcast. The band began promoting the single in Europe in 1992. In February, the band performed the song on the TV show Gottschalk.

Formats
7" single
"Universe" – 4:18
"Red Hot" – 3:35
"Merry Xmas Everybody" – 3:43

12" single
"Universe" – 4:18
"Red Hot" – 3:35
"Gypsy Roadhog" – 3:27
"Merry Xmas Everybody" – 3:43

Cassette single
"Universe" – 4:18
"Red Hot" – 3:35
"Merry Xmas Everybody" – 3:43

CD single
"Universe" – 4:18
"Red Hot" – 3:35
"Gypsy Roadhog" – 3:27
"Merry Xmas Everybody" – 3:43

Personnel
Slade
Noddy Holder – lead vocals
Jim Lea – bass, synthesiser, producer of "Universe" and "Red Hot", arranger and mixer on "Universe"
Dave Hill – lead guitar
Don Powell – drums

Additional personnel
Edward Shermaur – orchestral arrangement on "Universe"
Trevor Hallesy – engineer, mixer
Paul (The Bullet Boy) Talbot – engineer on "Red Hot"
Norma Lewis – backing vocals on "Red Hot"
Chas Chandler – producer of "Merry Xmas Everybody" and "Gypsy Roadhog"
Ray Palmer – sleeve photography
Allan D. Martin – sleeve design

References

1991 singles
Slade songs
Songs written by Jim Lea
1991 songs
Polydor Records singles
Song recordings produced by Jim Lea